The men's 100 metres event at the 1987 Pan American Games was held in Indianapolis, United States on 9 and 10 August.

Medalists

Results

Heats
Wind:Heat 1: +2.9 m/s, Heat 2: +2.7 m/s, Heat 3: +4.2 m/s, Heat 4: +3.5 m/s

Semifinals
Wind:Heat 1: +4.2 m/s, Heat 2: +6.0 m/s

Final
Wind: -3.4 m/s

References

Athletics at the 1987 Pan American Games
1987